Coleophora apta is a moth of the family Coleophoridae.

The larvae feed on Girgensohnia oppositiflora. They feed on the generative organs of their host plant.

References

apta
Moths described in 1991